The 2004–05 season was the 16th season of the Orlando Magic in the National Basketball Association (NBA).  After finishing the previous year with a league-worst 21–61 record, the Magic won the NBA Draft Lottery for the third time in franchise history, and selected high school star Dwight Howard with the first overall pick in the 2004 NBA draft. During the offseason, the Magic acquired All-Star guard Steve Francis and Cuttino Mobley from the Houston Rockets, and signed free agent Hedo Turkoglu. The team looked to be a playoff contender playing above .500 for the first half of the season. In January, Mobley was traded to the Sacramento Kings for Doug Christie. However, head coach Johnny Davis was fired after a 31–33 start, and was replaced with Chris Jent. The Magic finished third in the Southeast Division with a 36–46 record, a 15-game improvement from the previous season.

Grant Hill finally played a full season with the Magic averaging 19.7 points per game, while being selected to play in the 2005 NBA All-Star Game, his first All-Star selection since 2000. Howard was selected to the All-Rookie First Team, while Jameer Nelson made the All-Rookie Second Team.

Draft picks

Roster

Regular season

Season standings

z – clinched division title
y – clinched division title
x – clinched playoff spot

Record vs. opponents

Game log

Player statistics

Awards and honors
 Grant Hill – NBA Sportsmanship Award, All-Star
 Dwight Howard – All-Rookie 1st Team
 Jameer Nelson – All-Rookie 2nd Team

Transactions

References

Orlando Magic seasons
2004 in sports in Florida
2005 in sports in Florida